The Normanby Rugby League Football Club, commonly known as the Normanby Hounds, was formed at the Normanby Hotel in 1947.

Normanby competes in the Brisbane Rugby League and the Brisbane Second Division Rugby League with the club playing out of Purtell Park in Bardon, Queensland.

Alex Barnes is the current leading try scorer.

Head coach Wayne Treleaven and his son Ryan Dornan Treleaven  are working together to get this team back on top.

The Northside 1 team is led by Ryan Currie.

See also

References

External links

Rugby clubs established in 1947
1947 establishments in Australia
Rugby league teams in Brisbane
Bardon, Queensland